Night Round (French: Ronde de nuit) is a 1949 French crime film directed by François Campaux and starring Tilda Thamar, Julien Carette and Noël Roquevert.

The film's sets were designed by the art director Robert Hubert.

Partial cast
 Tilda Thamar as La 'marquise' 
 Julien Carette as Trinquet 
 Noël Roquevert as Brécard 
 André Gabriello as Poireau - le pochard 
 Pierre Larquey as Monsieur Labiche 
 Jacques Baumer as Le juge 
 Sinoël as Le bedeau 
 Milly Mathis as La bourgeoise 
 Marcel Vallée as Charentin

References

Bibliography 
 Philippe Rège. Encyclopedia of French Film Directors, Volume 1. Scarecrow Press, 2009.

External links 
 

1949 films
1940s French-language films
Films directed by François Campaux
Films about police officers
French Christmas films
Gaumont Film Company films
French crime films
1949 crime films
French black-and-white films
1940s French films